The Happy Jacks Creek, a perennial river that is part of the Murrumbidgee catchment within the Murray–Darling basin, is located in the Snowy Mountains region of New South Wales, Australia.

Course and features 
The Happy Jacks Creek (technically a river) rises near The Dip within the Kosciuszko National Park, sourced by runoff from the Australian Alps, part of the Great Dividing Range. The creek flows generally south by southwest and then north by northwest, joined by two minor tributaries, before reaching its confluence with the Tumut River (itself a tributary of the Murrumbidgee River), in remote mountainous country at the Happy Jacks Pondage, formed by the Happy Jacks Dam. The creek descends  over its  course, that is contained entirely within the Kosciuszko National Park.

The catchment area is part of the territory traditionally occupied by the Aboriginal Walgalu people, who were joined in the summer months by the Ngarigo and Ngunawal for the Bogong feasts.

See also 

 List of rivers of New South Wales (A-K)
 Rivers of New South Wales
 Snowy Mountains Scheme

References

External links
Murrumbidgee Catchment Management Authority  website
 

Rivers of New South Wales
Tributaries of the Murrumbidgee River
Snowy Valleys Council